Earl Alonzo Brininstool (October 11, 1870 – July 28, 1957), better known by E. A. Brininstool, was an American cowboy poet.

Biography
Brininstool was born in Warsaw, New York, and preferred to be called E. A. Brininstool. He was a cowboy poet, but was not a working cowboy. He lived most his life in Los Angeles, rubbed elbows with Will Rogers and Charles Russell, who met regularly as part of a western artists group at the University Club in LA. He is best known for Trail Dust of a Maverick (1914) and Bozeman Trail (1922).

Brininstool was a prolific author on the subject of Indian Wars, especially on Little Big Horn. He died on July 28, 1957.

References

External links
 
 
 E. A. Brininstool papers, MSS 1412 in the L. Tom Perry Special Collections, Harold B. Lee Library, Brigham Young University

Cowboy poets
1870 births
1957 deaths
People from Warsaw, New York
Writers from Los Angeles
19th-century American poets
American male poets
20th-century American poets
19th-century American male writers
20th-century American male writers
Poets from New York (state)